The fifth Robertson ministry was the 22nd ministry of the Colony of New South Wales, and was led by the Premier, Sir John Robertson. It was the fifth and final occasion that Robertson was Premier. Robertson was elected in the first free elections for the New South Wales Legislative Assembly held in March 1856.

The title of Premier was widely used to refer to the Leader of Government, but was not a formal position in the government until 1920. Instead the Premier was appointed to another portfolio, usually Colonial Secretary.

There was no party system in New South Wales politics until 1887. Under the constitution, ministers in the Legislative Assembly were required to resign to recontest their seats in a by-election when appointed. Such ministerial by-elections were usually uncontested and on this occasion all of the ministers were re-elected unopposed. Louis Heydon resigned on 4 February 1886 because he disagreed with the suggested property tax, and was not replaced as Minister of Justice.

This ministry covers the period from 22 December 1885 until 25 February 1886, when Robertson's government faltered due to the destablishing influence of his old foe, Sir Henry Parkes. Robertson was succeeded as Premier by Sir Patrick Jennings, and retired from parliament in June 1886.

Composition of ministry

Ministers are members of the Legislative Assembly unless otherwise noted.

See also

References

 

New South Wales ministries
1885 establishments in Australia
1886 disestablishments in Australia